Henry Ivor Aldridge (13 November 1899 – 2 June 1990) was an Australian rules footballer who played with St Kilda in the Victorian Football League (VFL).

Notes

External links 

1899 births
1990 deaths
Australian rules footballers from Melbourne
St Kilda Football Club players
Brighton Football Club players
Northcote Football Club players
Australian military personnel of World War I
People from Clifton Hill, Victoria
Military personnel from Melbourne